Kaipara Flats is a locality in the Rodney District of New Zealand. Warkworth is 12 km to the east, Ahuroa to the south, and Tauhoa to the north-west. The North Auckland railway line passes through the area.

The economy is mostly sheep and cattle farming, with lifestyle blocks increasing in popularity. The Rodney Aero Club has an airfield nearby.

A bridle track was established to Glorit on the Kaipara Harbour in 1899, and part was improved to a dray road the following year.  The North Auckland Line reached Kaipara Flats from Ahuroa in 1906.

Demographics
Kaipara Flats is part of the larger Puhoi Valley statistical area.

Kaipara Flats had a population of 168 at the 2018 New Zealand census, an increase of 30 people (21.7%) since the 2013 census, and an increase of 18 people (12.0%) since the 2006 census. There were 54 households, comprising 90 males and 81 females, giving a sex ratio of 1.11 males per female. The median age was 42.0 years (compared with 37.4 years nationally), with 42 people (25.0%) aged under 15 years, 18 (10.7%) aged 15 to 29, 90 (53.6%) aged 30 to 64, and 21 (12.5%) aged 65 or older.

Ethnicities were 91.1% European/Pākehā, 12.5% Māori, 3.6% Asian, and 3.6% other ethnicities. People may identify with more than one ethnicity.

Although some people chose not to answer the census's question about religious affiliation, 62.5% had no religion, 26.8% were Christian, 3.6% had Māori religious beliefs and 1.8% had other religions.

Of those at least 15 years old, 18 (14.3%) people had a bachelor's or higher degree, and 24 (19.0%) people had no formal qualifications. The median income was $31,100, compared with $31,800 nationally. 24 people (19.0%) earned over $70,000 compared to 17.2% nationally. The employment status of those at least 15 was that 66 (52.4%) people were employed full-time, 27 (21.4%) were part-time, and 3 (2.4%) were unemployed.

Education
Kaipara Flats School is a coeducational contributing primary (years 1-6) school with a roll of  students as of  The school was established in 1878.

Notes

External links
Kaipara Flats School website

Rodney Local Board Area
Populated places in the Auckland Region